Samuel DeWitt "Sam" Hennings (born December 17, 1950) is an American actor, best known for his roles in Memphis Beat, Four Good Days, Supernatural, and his starring role in The Work and the Glory trilogy.

Life and career

Born in Macon, Georgia, Hennings spent much of his youth in Athens. Hennings has lived in New York City, San Francisco and Los Angeles for much of his acting career.

Hennings has been an actor since 1985. He starred in a variety of films and television shows. This included more than 70 feature films and television productions. His cinematic roles include Four Good Days with Glenn Close and Mila Kunis, The Work and the Glory trilogy, Martin Scorsese's The Aviator with Leonardo DiCaprio, Havoc with Anne Hathaway, Ten Tricks with Lea Thompson, Drop Zone with Wesley Snipes, Pawn Shop Chronicles with Paul Walker, Brendan Fraser, Norman Reedus, and Elijah Wood, Shout with John Travolta, Seasons of the Heart, Point Last Seen with Linda Hamilton, Final Shot: The Hank Gathers Story with George Kennedy, and Gideon Oliver: The Last Plane from Coramaya with Louis Gossett Jr., among others. Series regular in Memphis Beat with Alfre Woodard and Jason Lee, He has starred in various television series including The Magnificent Seven, 24, CSI: Crime Scene Investigation and CSI: Miami, ER, E-Ring and Star Trek: The Next Generation. He has had recurring roles on the CBS series JAG, Resurrection Blvd., and in Pensacola: Wings of Gold as the brother of James Brolin's character.

In 2007, he had a recurring guest role on the TNT series Saving Grace as the brother of Holly Hunter's character. In 2009 he co-starred with Josh Lucas and Jon Hamm in the thriller Stolen.

From September to October 2003, he appeared in the Los Angeles Theater in the play Ten Tricks, which was filmed in 2006. The play is about the lives of prostitutes and magicians.

Filmography

Film

Television

References

External links
 

Living people
American male television actors
American male film actors
Male actors from Georgia (U.S. state)
1950 births